Future Medicine is a privately owned company based in London, England, United Kingdom. It is part of Future Science Publishing Group, primarily to publish peer-reviewed medical journals. Future Medicine publishes hybrid and full open access journals.

Business model
Future Medicine publishes open access or subscription journals, which are owned by the respective societies they serve. The open access journals require authors to pay an article processing charge. The company also provides an accelerated publication option, with speedy processing and publication of accepted articles within 6 weeks of submission.

Journals

In 2016, the company sold several of its journals to OMICS Publishing Group, who moved them to Pulsus Group, a company they recently acquired. OMICS is widely regarded as predatory publisher.

The journals sold were
Clinical Practice
Diabetes Management
Imaging in Medicine
International Journal of Clinical Rheumatology
Interventional Cardiology
Neuropsychiatry

References

External links

Academic publishing companies
Publishing companies of the United Kingdom
Publishing companies established in 2001
2001 establishments in the United Kingdom